The Primera División de Fútbol Profesional Clausura 2000 season (officially "Copa Clima Clausura 2000") started on January 15, 2000, and finished on July 1, 2000.

The season saw C.D. Luis Angel Firpo win its th league title after a 10-9 penalty victory over ADET in the final after the game was ted at 1-1.

Team information

Personnel and sponsoring

Managerial changes

Before the start of the season

During the season

League standings

Semifinals 1st Leg

Semifinals 2nd Leg

Final

List of foreign players in the league
This is a list of foreign players in Clausura 2000. The following players:
have played at least one apetura game for the respective club.
have not been capped for the El Salvador national football team on any level, independently from the birthplace

ADET
  Eduardo Cocherari
  Adrian Vera
C.D. Águila
  Carlos Daniel Escalante
  Pedro Cardozo
  Gabriel Lučić
  Sergio Ibarra
  Marcio Sampaio
  Paul Cominges

Alianza F.C.
  Cecilio Galeano
  Alex Carioca
  Agnaldo Oliveira
  Alexandro Martin
  Alejandro Curbelo

Atletico Marte
  Alex Norival Machado
  Pedro Salazar

Dragon
  Marco De Oliveira
   Roberto da Silva
  German Rodriguez
  Edgar Fleitas/Fleytas
  Mothar Kante Kabu

 (player released mid season)
  (player Injured mid season)
 Injury replacement player

C.D. FAS
  Emiliano Pedrozo
  Marco Soares
  Alemán Bor-man
  Miguel Mariano
  Antonio Serrano

Juventud Olimpica Metalio
  TBD

C.D. Luis Ángel Firpo
  Mauricio Do Santos
  Raul Toro
  Washington Hernández

Municipal Limeno
   Carlos Villarreal
  Jahir Camero
   César Charum 
  Roberto Ventura
  Arnaldo Ferreira
  Carlos Pancita Rodríguez Marín

Santa Clara
  Edgar Montaño
  Mario Pavón

Aggregate table

Top scorers

External links

Primera División de Fútbol Profesional Clausura seasons
El
1